can refer to:
 JR Takarazuka Line, an alias of a part of the Fukuchiyama Line (between Osaka Station and Sasayamaguchi Station)
 Hankyū Takarazuka Main Line

ja:京都線